See also The Bullfight, Bullfight – Death of the Bull, and The Dead Man (Manet)

Bullfight (French - Combat de taureau ) is an 1865-1866 painting by Édouard Manet, now in the Musée d'Orsay in Paris. It was produced after the artist's trip to Spain in 1865 and forms part of his Spanish period (1862-1867).

The painting depicts a rare event in the Spanish bullfight, when the bull manages to attack and bring down the horse. Admired and backed by Charles Baudelaire and Émile Zola, the work was so strongly attacked by other art critics that Manet kept it in his studio until 1872, when the Frères Goncourt praised it.

Bibliography
 
 Adolphe Tabarant, Manet et ses œuvres, Paris, Gallimard, 1947, 600 p.
 Édouard Manet, Lettres d'Édouard Manet sur son voyage en Espagne, Paris, Arts, 16 mars 1945
 
  
 Sophie Monneret, L'Impressionnisme et son époque, vol. 2, t. 1, Paris, Robert Laffont, 1987, 997 p.

References

Paintings by Édouard Manet
1865 paintings
1866 paintings
Paintings in the collection of the Musée d'Orsay
Cattle in art